Hyetussa longithorax is a species of spider in the jumping spider family Salticidae, found in Panama.

References

Salticidae
Spiders of Central America
Spiders described in 1925